is a Japanese manga series co-written and illustrated by Banri Sendo and Shibuko Ebara, credited under their pen name Peach-Pit. It was serialized monthly by MediaWorks in their magazines Dengeki Comic Gao! from October 2001 to September 2005 and Dengeki Maoh from October to November 2005 and was later published into ten volumes by the company. The manga was licensed and translated into English by Tokyopop. A 13-episode anime was adapted by MSJ and a PlayStation 2 video game was produced by MediaWorks.

Plot
Exactly one year prior to the beginning of DearS, humanity made unprecedented contact with extraterrestrial life. Forced to crash land into Tokyo Bay when, en route to their home planet of Thanatos, their spacecraft breaks down, 150 humanoid aliens are naturalized into Japanese society and affectionately nicknamed "DearS"; a portmanteau of the words "Dear" and "Friends".

Takeya Ikuhara is a temperamental seventeen-year-old Japanese student attending the fictitious Koharu High School with a strong prejudice against the DearS. Due to a childhood scare, he believes that the aliens are fake, worthless beings that have generated nationwide overhype and are secretly plotting to take control of Earth.

On his way home from school he discovers a homeless DearS who, after fainting and much to his annoyance, he feeds and shelters in his apartment. The girl, who he nicknames Ren, is infantile and friendly, and grows obsequious and dependent upon Takeya, a responsibility he tries to disassociate himself from. Her oblivious tenacity keeps her around, however, and over time, realizing Ren's genuine care and empathy for him, Takeya has a change of heart. Unfortunately, because Ren is deemed defective, DearS headquarters orders her arrest.

Characters

Media

Manga 
DearS began as a manga series co-written and illustrated by Banri Sendo and Shibuko Ebara, credited under their pen name Peach-Pit, which was serialized in MediaWorks' Dengeki Comic Gao! manga magazine from October 2001 to November 2005. The manga was compiled into ten tankōbon volumes released by MediaWorks in Japan. The series was later translated into English and German by Tokyopop, French by Semic Comics and Italian by Flashbook Editore.

Volume list

Anime 

DearS was adapted into a twelve episode television and single original video animation anime by MSJ with co-production by Bandai Visual, Geneon Entertainment, Lantis and TeaM DearS. The series was directed by Iku Suzuki. The series was broadcast on Chiba TV, TV Kanagawa, TV Saitama, Tokyo MX TV, TV Santerebi, TV Aichi and TVQ Kyushu from July 10 to September 26, 2004. Four DVD compilation volumes were released from August 2, 2005 to February 21, 2006. The anime has been re-licensed by Discotek Media.

Video game 
A visual novel video game was developed and published by MediaWorks for the PlayStation 2. It was released on June 24, 2004. It received a C rating by the Computer Entertainment Rating Organization.

References

 Book references

External links
 Official website 
 
 

2002 manga
2004 anime television series debuts
2004 video games
2005 anime OVAs
Bandai Visual
Dengeki Comic Gao!
Kadokawa Dwango franchises
Geneon USA
Japan-exclusive video games
Peach-Pit
PlayStation 2 games
PlayStation 2-only games
Shōnen manga
Tokyopop titles
Discotek Media
Video games developed in Japan
Extraterrestrials in anime and manga